Vincent Chevalier (1770 - 1841) was a French engineer, inventor and optician.

Biography 
He was born in 1770 in Paris, France. He played a key role in the history of the camera. 

The very first photograph was taken in 1825 by Joseph Nicéphore Niépce, a French inventor who used a sliding wooden camera box made by Chevalier.

He died in 1841 in Paris, France. 

His son became a manufacturer of cameras and lenses.

Legacy 

Chevalier was the first to develop a microscope to use a combination of lens elements corrected for chromatic aberrations.

The sophisticated compound lenses manufactured by Chevalier were described as the "cutting-edge technological craftsmanship of the day".

See also

 History of the camera
 Heliography

References

External links 
 Vincent Chevalier – Who Knew Whom
 Vincent Chevalier and Son | Science Museum Group Collection

French inventors
French engineers
1770 births
1841 deaths